Howe Township is the name of some places in the U.S. state of Pennsylvania:

Howe Township, Forest County, Pennsylvania
Howe Township, Perry County, Pennsylvania

Pennsylvania township disambiguation pages